Andrew McCormack (born 24 March 1978) is a British jazz pianist.

Biography 
McCormack recorded his debut album Telescope in 2006 and was awarded BBC Jazz Awards Rising Star in the same year. The London Symphony Orchestra commissioned apiece for a Barbican Centre concert in 2009 as part of their Panufnik Young Composers Scheme. Since 2007 he has been a member of Kyle Eastwood's quintet. His second album, Live in London, was released by Edition in 2012.

McCormack has performed and recorded two albums with saxophonist Jason Yarde.

In 2014, McCormack performed as the Andrew MacCormack Trio with drummer Colin Stranahan and bassist Sam Lasserson.

Discography
 Telescope (Dune, 2005)
 My Duo  with Jason Yarde (Joy and Ears, 2009)
 Places and Other Spaces  with Jason Yarde (Edition, 2011)
 Live in London (Edition, 2012)
 First Light (Edition, 2014)
 Graviton (Jazz Village, 2017)
 Graviton: The Calling (Ubuntu Music, 2019) 
 Solo (Ubuntu Music, 2020)

References 

1978 births
Living people
21st-century British pianists
British jazz pianists
English jazz pianists